The Summit Athletic Conference, or SAC, is a high school athletic conference consisting of ten high schools located in Fort Wayne, Indiana. Three of the schools are private; one being a Lutheran academy, and the other two being Catholic preparatories. The rest are public schools, being part of Fort Wayne Community Schools. Two limited members are part of Northwest Allen County Schools and Southwest Allen County Schools.

All member schools are located in Allen County, Indiana. Originally called the Fort Wayne City Series, the name was changed to the Summit Athletic Conference in 1973, when Harding High School joined.

Elmhurst High School closed at the end of the 2009-10 academic year, with students being spread out between North Side, South Side, and Wayne high schools. Harding closed at the end of the 2010-11 school year.

Membership

 Concordia played in the NEIAC 1955-65, and in both the FWCS/Summit and NEIAC 1965-75.
 North Side and South Side played concurrently in the FWCS and NEIAC 1934-1940.
 North Side played concurrently in the FWCS and Northern Indiana Athletic Conference 1942-65.
 South Side played concurrently in the FWCS and Central Indiana Athletic Conference 1945-47.

Former members

 Central played concurrently in the FWCS and NEIAC 1934-40. Central split into Northrop and Wayne when school closed.
 Central Catholic, while a FWCS member, did not join the IHSAA until 1946, when private schools and segregated public schools were allowed into the organization.
 Harding was converted to magnet school in 2012.

Membership timeline

Football divisions 
From 1971 to 1979, football competition was divided into North and South divisions.

Conference champions

Football 

 N and S designations are division champions, O denotes title game winner.

Boys basketball

Girls basketball

State championships

Bishop Dwenger Saints (13)
 1983 Football (3A)
 1990 Football (3A)
 1991 Football (3A)
 1995 Gymnastics
 2003 Gymnastics
 2005 Gymnastics
 2005 Girls Soccer
 2006 Gymnastics
 2006 Girls Soccer
 2010 Softball (3A)
 2012 Gymnastics
 2015 Football (4A)
 2018 Football (4A)

Bishop Luers Knights (20)
 1985 Football (2A)
 1989 Football (2A)
 1992 Football (2A)
 1999 Girls Basketball (2A)
 1999 Football (2A)
 2000 Girls Basketball (2A)
 2001 Football (2A)
 2001 Girls Basketball (2A)
 2002 Football (2A)
 2002 Girls Basketball (2A)
 2006 Girls Basketball (2A)
 2007 Football (2A)
 2008 Boys Basketball (2A)
 2008 Baseball (2A)
 2009 Football (2A)
 2009 Boys Basketball (2A)
 2010 Football (2A)
 2011 Girls Basketball (2A)
 2011 Football (2A)
 2012 Football (2A)

Concordia Lutheran Cadets (7)
 1983 Girls Cross Country
 1999 Boys Track & Field
 2010 Girls Basketball (3A)
 2012 Girls Basketball (3A)
 2014 Girls Volleyball (3A)
 2016 Football (3A)
 2019 Boys Cross Country

North Side Legends (7)
 1941 Boys Track & Field
 1942 Boys Track & Field
 1956 Boys Track & Field
 1957 Boys Track & Field
 1963 Boys Track & Field
 1965 Boys Track & Field
 1968 Boys Cross-Country

Northrop Bruins (16)
 1974 Boys Basketball
 1981 Girls Track & Field
 1983 Baseball
 1984 Boys Golf
 1986 Girls Basketball
 1991 Girls Track & Field
 1997 Boys Track & Field
 2000 Girls Track & Field
 2001 Girls Track & Field
 2002 Girls Track & Field
 2003 Girls Track & Field
 2004 Boys Track & Field
 2004 Girls gymnastics
 2005 Girls Track & Field
 2011 Girls Track & Field
 2013 Girls Track & Field

Snider Panthers (9)
 1974 Boys Track & Field
 1987 Volleyball
 1988 Girls Basketball
 1991 Volleyball
 1992 Football (5A)
 2003 Wrestling
 2006 Baseball (4A)
 2009 Baseball (4A)
 2015 Football (5A)

South Side Archers (7)
 1938 Boys Basketball
 1958 Boys Basketball
 1968 Boys Track & Field
 1980 Girls Track & Field
 1985 Girls Track & Field
 1986 Girls Track & Field
 1989 Girls Track & Field
 2013 Girls Basketball Runnerup.

Wayne Generals (3)
 1973 Girls Tennis
 1979 Boys Track & Field
 1995 Football (4A)

Homestead Spartans (10)
 2015 Boys Basketball (4A) [not in SAC]
 2017 Girls Basketball (4A)
 2019 Girls Golf [not in SAC]
 2021 Girls Soccer (3A) [not in SAC]
1983, 1984, 1985, 1996, 1999, 2001 Girls Gymnastics [not in SAC]

Central Tigers (2) 1
 1943 Boys Basketball
 1944 Boys Track & Field

Central Catholic Irish (2) 1
 1950 Football (mythical champion)
 1959 Boys Golf

Elmhurst Trojans (1) 1
 2009 Girls Basketball (3A)

Harding Hawks (4) 1
 1994 Girls Track & Field
 1995 Girls Track & Field
 2001 Boys Basketball (2A)
 2006 Football (2A)

1 Won while SAC Member.

Notable athletes
 Jason Baker, NFL punter
 Jessie Bates, NFL safety
 Damarcus Beasley, professional soccer player, two time FIFA World Cup Finals participant
 Jamar Beasley, professional soccer player
 Vaughn Dunbar, former professional football player, NFL New Orleans Saints
 Tyler Eifert, NFL tight end
 Trai Essex, NFL, offensive lineman
 Jason Fabini, NFL offensive tackle for the Jets, Cowboys and Washington Football Team
 Josh Gaines, AFL defensive lineman
 Tiffany Gooden, former professional basketball player, Colorado Xplosion
 James Hardy, NFL wide receiver
 Jim Hinga, NCAA Div I basketball coach
 Selwyn Lymon, NFL, wide receiver
 Jim Master, Indiana Mr. Basketball (1980), high school All-American, University of Kentucky
 Jarrod Parker, MLB pitcher, graduated from Norwell High School after attending Wayne High School
 Bernard Pollard, NFL safety
 Brian Reith, former MLB pitcher
 Ben Skowronek, NFL wide receiver
 Jaylon Smith, NFL linebacker
 Lamar Smith, NFL running back
 Rod Smith, NFL running back
 Anthony Spencer, NFL linebacker
 Caleb Swanigan, Former NBA Player
 Deshaun Thomas, Indiana's 3rd all time leading men's scorer in basketball
 Max Touloute, professional soccer player, Haitian national team member
 Eric Wedge, MLB manager
 Sharon Wichman, swimmer, Olympic gold medalist, 1968 Summer Olympics
 Rod Woodson, NFL Hall of Famer

Resources
 IHSAA Conferences
 IHSAA Directory

References

Indiana high school athletic conferences
High school sports conferences and leagues in the United States